Iyabo Akanmu (born 12 August 1968) is a Nigerian table tennis player. She competed in the 1988 Summer Olympics.

References

1968 births
Living people
Table tennis players at the 1988 Summer Olympics
Nigerian female table tennis players
Olympic table tennis players of Nigeria
Yoruba sportswomen